Artemio Strazzi (14 November 1921 – 19 April 2013) was an Italian politician who served as Mayor of Ancona in 1964, President of the Province of Ancona in 1970 and Deputy in the 6th Legislature (1972–1976).

References

1921 births
2013 deaths
Mayors of Ancona
Deputies of Legislature VI of Italy
Presidents of the Province of Ancona